The Spur Award is an annual literary prize awarded by the Western Writers of America.

Spur Awards for Best Drama Scripts

Peter Hamill for Doc (1972)
Nicholas Meyer, Sarah Kernochan for Sommersby (1994)

American literary awards